Radio Deutschland was a radio station in the UK during World War II that broadcast propaganda to the German nation and its armed services. The station was broadcast on a frequency close to well-known German radio stations, so German people would tune in by accident, and be lulled into its content. Many German people believed it was a real German radio station.

See also
 Radio 1212

References
 Unsung Heroes: The Twentieth Century's Forgotten History-Makers ,

Defunct radio stations in the United Kingdom
Military deception during World War II
British propaganda organisations
World War II propaganda radio stations